Rashin Wurie (born 27 December 1972 in Freetown, Sierra Leone) is a former Sierra Leonean international footballer.

Career

Wurie spent most of his professional career in Belgium, where he played for K. Boom F.C. in the Belgian First Division and Belgian Second Division from 1990 until 1993, as well as K. Beerschot V.A.C. in the Second Division for the 1993–94 through 1996–97 seasons. He also had brief spells with Lok Altmark Stendal and Eintracht Braunschweig in the German Regionalliga.

International career

He was included in the Sierra Leone national team for the 1996 African Nations Cup in South Africa and also took part in Sierra Leone's 1998 FIFA World Cup qualification campaign. During his playing days for the Leone Stars (as Sierra Leone national football team is known), he was one of the most entertaining footballers in the national as well as one of the most popular players among the Sierra Leonean fans.

References

External links 
 

1972 births
Living people
Sportspeople from Freetown
Sierra Leonean footballers
Sierra Leonean expatriate footballers
Sierra Leone international footballers
Association football midfielders
K. Beerschot V.A.C. players
R.A.E.C. Mons players
Eintracht Braunschweig players
Belgian Pro League players
Challenger Pro League players
Expatriate footballers in Germany
Expatriate footballers in Belgium
Sierra Leonean expatriate sportspeople in Belgium
1996 African Cup of Nations players